Chaima Khammar (born 14 September 1999) is a footballer who plays as a midfielder for American collegiate team UMass Lowell River Hawks. Born in Germany, she has made one appearance for the Tunisia women's national team.

Early life
Khammar was raised in Cologne.

College career
Khammar has attended the University of Massachusetts Lowell in the United States.

Club career
Khammar has played for 1. FC Köln in Germany.

International career
Khammar has capped for Tunisia at senior level, including in a 2–0 friendly away win over Jordan on 13 June 2021.

See also
List of Tunisia women's international footballers

References

External links

1999 births
Living people
Tunisia women's international footballers
Tunisian expatriate footballers
Tunisian expatriate sportspeople in the United States
Tunisian women's footballers
Citizens of Tunisia through descent
Expatriate women's soccer players in the United States
Footballers from Cologne
German expatriate footballers
German expatriate sportspeople in the United States
German people of Tunisian descent
German sportspeople of African descent
German women's footballers
German expatriate women's footballers
1. FC Köln (women) players
Frauen-Bundesliga players
2. Frauen-Bundesliga players
UMass Lowell River Hawks women's soccer players
University of Massachusetts Lowell alumni
Women's association football midfielders